The 2013 Atlantic Sun men's basketball tournament took place from March 6 – March 9, 2013 at Hawkins Arena in Macon, Georgia.

Format
The A-Sun Championship was a four-day single-elimination tournament. The top eight teams (with the exception of Northern Kentucky) competed in the championship. As part of their transition to Division I from Division II, Northern Kentucky was not be eligible for post season play until 2017, including the A-Sun tournament. The winner of the tournament earned the A-Sun's automatic bid into the 2013 NCAA tournament.

Defending champion Belmont was not in the tournament, as they moved to the Ohio Valley Conference for the 2012-13 season.

Bracket

See also
2012-13 NCAA Division I men's basketball season
Atlantic Sun men's basketball tournament

External links 
 Atlantic Sun Men's Basketball Championship Tournament Central

ASUN men's basketball tournament
Tournament
Atlantic Sun men's basketball tournament
Atlantic Sun men's basketball tournament
Basketball in Georgia (U.S. state)